Baykal is a village in Kormilovsky District of Omsk Oblast, Russia.

References

Rural localities in Omsk Oblast